Dewald Potgieter (born 22 February 1987 in Port Elizabeth, South Africa) is a professional South African rugby union rugby player. His first tour with the Springboks was to France, Italy, Ireland & England in late 2009. Potgieter has won 2 Super Rugby titles and a Currie Cup.

Honours
Cravenweek – 1999–2005
Eastern Province Grant Khomo week 2003
Eastern Province U18 Craven week captain 2004
Eastern Province U18 Craven Week Captain 2005
Green Squad 2004
SA Schools 2005
Blue Bulls U19 2006
Blue Bulls U21 2007
Vodacom Blue Bulls 2006–2009
SA U21 2006
Vodacom Blue Bulls U21 Absa Competition – 2007
Emerging Springboks – 2007–2009
Springboks – 2009 to current

External links

From TheBulls
itsrugby.co.uk profile

South African rugby union players
South Africa international rugby union players
Living people
1987 births
Bulls (rugby union) players
Blue Bulls players
Rugby union players from Port Elizabeth
Afrikaner people
South African people of Dutch descent
Shizuoka Blue Revs players
Expatriate rugby union players in Japan
South African expatriate sportspeople in Japan
South African expatriate rugby union players
Rugby union flankers